Mario Da Vinci, stage name of Alfonso Sorrentino (14 March 1942 – 10 May 2015) was an Italian Canzone Napoletana singer and actor.

Born in  Naples, the son of a fisherman, during his career which he started in the 1960s Da Vinci recorded 13 albums and over sixty singles.  Da Vinci   participated four times at the Festival di Napoli, winning the 1981 edition with the song "’A mamma". His variegated career included television, theatre and  films.

Discography 
Album 
     1964: Nostalgia di Napoli  
     1973: ’O bello per tutte le belle   
     1976: Miracolo 'e Natale  
     1977: Mario & Sal Da Vinci Vol. 1   
     1977: Mario & Sal Da Vinci Vol. 2  
     1977: ’O scugnizzo e 'o signore  
     1978: Figlio mio sono innocente   
     1979: Vasame ancora   
     1979: Napoli storia d'amore e di vendetta  
     1980: Muntevergine (Mamma Schiavona)   
     1981: ’O motorino   
     1982: Annabella  
     1983: Footing

References

External links  
 Mario Da Vinci at Discogs

Musicians from Naples
1942 births
2015 deaths
Italian male film actors
Italian male stage actors
20th-century Italian male  singers